Melvilasom (The Address) is a 2011 Indian courtroom drama film directed by Madhav Ramadasan and written by Soorya Krishnamoorthy. It stars Suresh Gopi and Parthiban in the lead roles, and features Ashokan, Thalaivasal Vijay, Nizhalgal Ravi, Krishnakumar and Sanjay in other pivotal roles. An adaptation of Soorya Krishna Moorthy's stage play of the same name, which itself was based on the Hindi play Court Martial by Swadesh Deepak, the film reached theatres  on 29 April 2011. It received wide critical acclaim upon release and got a dubbed release in Tamil as Ulvilaasam.

The film does not feature any female characters, except the adopted daughter of Sawar Ramachandran, or songs. The entire film was shot inside a room and filming was completed in just nine days. Sticking close to the Aristotelian unities, the screen time of an hour and half dovetails perfectly with real time. It is widely regarded as one of the defining movies of the Malayalam New Wave.

Plot
 
The film traces the progress of a court martial of a Dalit soldier, Sawar Ramachandran, who has been accused of killing Capt. Verma and attempting to kill Capt. Kapoor, while on guard duty. There are eyewitnesses who have noted that the incident happened in a fit of rage but are clueless about what actually transpired before Ramachandran used his weapon and even Ramachandran has pleaded guilty without being ready to disclose anything else. Prosecutor Major Ajay Puri has every intention to set the noose hanging and ready for Ramachandran. From the outset, Captain Vikas Roy, who defends the accused, is pessimistic about his chances of saving his client. But, still, he is bent on finding the truth behind the incident. And the truth is apparently an "eye opener" for the army as well as society.

Cast
 Suresh Gopi as Captain Vikas Roy
 Parthiban as Sawar Ramachandran
 Krishna Kumar as Captain Bhikhari Das Kapoor
 Ashokan as Captain Dr. Gupta
 Nizhalgal Ravi as Major Ajay Puri
 Thalaivasal Vijay as Colonel Surat Singh
 Sanjay as Lieutenant Colonel Brajrendra Rawat
 V.K Baiju as Army officer
 Naveen Arakkal as Army officer

Production

Play
The film is based on the play of the same name that marked the theatre debut of Soorya Krishna Moorthy. It was staged for the first time at Gorky Bhavan in 2005. It became a major success, and has been staged at more than 400 stages around the world. The play was based on the Hindi play Court Martial (1991) by Swadesh Deepak. It was also inspired by real-life incidents narrated by Krishnamoorthy's mentor Gopi Poojapura, a former soldier in the Indian army. The film also gives credit to Court Martial and Gopi Poojapura.

Filming
The film was shot from in a single room at the University Men's Hostel in Thiruvananthapuram, in ten days.

Critical reception
The film received wide critical acclaim. Sify labelled the film a "welcome experiment in Malayalam". The film is described as "technically brilliant".Film director Madhav Ramadasan giving a good contribution as a dissimilar making style in Malayalam typical film making. This film appears a big blow in film making traditional line of attack in India and Kerala. In regard to performances, the critic praises Suresh Gopi saying he "is absolutely brilliant as Captain Vikas Roy and he scores with his amazing dialogue delivery." Parthiban is appreciated as "he gives subtle acting an altogether different meaning, even though his dialogues are limited to only a few minutes. His lines towards the end can leave you with a lump in the throat."

Nowrunning.com stated, "Melvilasom is a reflection of the staunch belief that a film maker has on his script. It displays a fine sensibility in whatever it has to say, and is peppered all over with real enthusiastic performances."
The Hindu also published an extremely positive review stating, "the story is effectively told with well crafted dialogues and riveting performances by the main actors."
Rediff rated the film  and said, "Melvilasom is exciting as it experiments with new ways of storytelling. Melvilasom is the kind of film that leaves you happy for simply surpassing your expectations."

Awards and accolades

Awards
 The 15th Gollapudi Srinivas  National award for the ‘Best Debut Director 2011’ 
 P. Bhaskaran award for the Best Feature film of 2011.
 P. Bhaskaran award for the Best Actor of 2011 - Parthiban.

Film festival participation
Melvilasom got selected to the 16th Busan International Film Festival (BIFF), in Busan, South Korea. The Director was also presented with the 15th Gollapudi Srinivas National Award which is given for the best direction for a debut movie.
It has also been selected to the Indian Panorama section of the 42nd International Film Festival of India (IFFI), in Panaji, India, and Malayalam Cinema Today section of the International Film Festival of Kerala, in Thiruvananthapuram, India.

See also
Trial film

References

External links
 

2010s Malayalam-language films
Military courtroom films
2011 directorial debut films
2011 films
Indian films based on plays
Films shot in Thiruvananthapuram